Louis-Philippe Pelletier,  (February 1, 1857 – February 8, 1921) was a Canadian lawyer, journalist, newspaper owner, politician, professor, and judge.

Biography
Born in Trois-Pistoles, Lower Canada, the son of Thomas-Philippe Pelletier and Caroline Casault, the sister of Louis-Napoléon Casault, Pelletier was educated at the Collège de Sainte-Anne-de-la-Pocatière and received a law degree from the Université Laval. He articled with Auguste-Réal Angers and was called to the Quebec bar in 1880.

After being defeated in the 1908 federal election, he was elected to the House of Commons of Canada for the riding of Quebec County in the 1911 election. A Conservative, he was the Postmaster General from 1911 to 1914. He resigned in October 1914 and was appointed a Superior Court judge for the district of Montreal. In August 1915 he was appointed to the Quebec Court of King’s Bench.

Prior to his entry to federal politics, Pelletier was also a member of the Legislative Assembly of Quebec after being elected in Dorchester as a Conservative in 1888 and retained his seat until 1904 when he did not seek another re-election. He attempted a return in 1908 but was defeated.

References
 
 
 
 

1857 births
1921 deaths
Lawyers in Quebec
Canadian newspaper founders
Canadian newspaper publishers (people)
Conservative Party of Quebec MLCs
Conservative Party of Quebec MNAs
Members of the Executive Council of Quebec
Academic staff of Université Laval
Legal educators
Conservative Party of Canada (1867–1942) MPs
Members of the House of Commons of Canada from Quebec
Members of the King's Privy Council for Canada
Postmasters General of Canada
Judges in Quebec
Université Laval alumni
People from Trois-Pistoles, Quebec